Bujo may refer to:

 A type of fortune telling fraud
 Bullet Journal, a personal organization system